Tekstilshchiki is a station on the Bolshaya Koltsevaya line of the Moscow Metro. A transfer to Tekstilshchiki is planned. It was opened on 1 March 2023.

Gallery

References

Moscow Metro stations
Bolshaya Koltsevaya line
Railway stations located underground in Russia
Railway stations under construction in Russia